Roggan River is a small village in Northern Quebec, Canada, situated on the Roggan River along a peninsula at the edge of James Bay and Hudson Bay.

External links 
 Roggan River, Quebec

Communities in Nord-du-Québec
Populated coastal places in Canada
Road-inaccessible communities of Quebec